Aristolochia stevensii is a plant species native to northwestern Nicaragua and southwestern Honduras. It grows in wet montane forests.

Aristolochia stevensii is a liana climbing over other vegetation. Stems are woody, up to 2 cm in diameter, the bark tomentose when young, corky when older. Leaves are ovate, up to 17 cm long. Flowers are borne in racemes in the axils of the leaves, dull yellow with a purple center.

References

stevensii
Flora of Nicaragua
Flora of Honduras